Madhya Bharat Sports Club is an Indian football club based in Bhopal, Madhya Pradesh. The club last competed in the I-League 2nd Division, the second tier of Indian football league system. They are also eligible to play in Madhya Pradesh Premier League.

History
Madhya Bharat Sports Club was founded in 2017 in collaboration with Celtic F.C. Academy. The club along with Pride Sports FC emerged as the two existing semi-professional clubs in the Indian state of Madhya Pradesh. In 2017, they roped in their first foreign coach José Carlos Hevia from Spain and began the pre-season journey with comfortable win against Hazrat Nizamuddin FC. The 2017–18 season, was disastrous for them as they bowed out from group B, without a single win.

On 21 August 2018, All India Football Federation announced that Madhya Bharat will participate in 2018–19 I-League 2nd Division, but they later withdrew.

In the 2018–19 I-League 2nd Division, Madhya Bharat finished at the bottom of the Preliminary round group B.

Stadium
Madhya Bharat plays most of their home matches at the Tatya Tope Nagar Sports Complex in Bhopal, which has a seating capacity of 20,000 spectators.

Kit manufacturers and shirt sponsors

Last registered staff

Managerial history
updated on 28 May 2017

Team records

Seasons

Partnership
Madhya Bharat Sports Club has joined the Celtic Football Academy’s international partnership programme in a long-term agreement for boosting the football academy and implementing football development model in Bhopal.

According to the official statements from both sides, partnership follows Celtic's previous successful relationships in India with both che Mahindra United FC and two-time national league champions, Salgaocar FC.

Affiliated clubs
The following club is currently affiliated with Madhya Bharat FC:
  Celtic FC (2017–present)

See also
 Pride Sports FC
 List of football clubs in India

References

External links
 Madhya Bharat SC at Khel Now

 
Football clubs in Madhya Pradesh
Association football clubs established in 2017
I-League 2nd Division clubs
2017 establishments in Madhya Pradesh